Nittel is a village municipality Rhineland-Palatinate, Germany.

Nittel may also refer to:

Surname 
 Nittel (surname), a surname of German origin
 Ahren Nittel (born 1983), ice hockey player
 Heinz Nittel (1931–1981), politician

Other uses 
 Nittel Nacht, Jewish scholastic name for Christmas Eve